Andrea Tiberi (born 15 November 1985) is an Italian mountain bike racer. He rode at the cross-country event at the 2016 Summer Olympics.

References

1985 births
Living people
Italian male cyclists
Italian mountain bikers
Cyclists at the 2016 Summer Olympics
Cyclists at the 2015 European Games
European Games competitors for Italy
Olympic cyclists of Italy
Cyclists from Turin